Abu'lgharib Artsuni or Abul Gharib Arsruni was Lord of Birejik and chief of the Pahlavuni clan.  He was governor of the Taurus mountain region and Mopsuestia for the Emperor Alexios I.  Abu'lgharib was a kinsman of Oshin of Lampron who married one of his daughters.  He ceded forts at Lampron and Barbaron near the Cilician Gates to Oshin.  He was installed as governor of Birejik by Baldwin I following the crushing of an Armenian conspiracy in 1098.  He joined Baldwin I and Kogh Vasil in their campaign in the north in 1109.  Finally, he was displaced by Baldwin II in 1116 who gave Birejik to his cousin Waleran of Le Puiset, who married another of Abu’lghrib’s daughters.

References

Sources 
 Runciman, Steven, A History of the Crusades, Volume One: The First Crusade and the Foundation of the Kingdom of Jerusalem, Cambridge University Press, London, 1951, pg. 211
 Runciman, Steven, A History of the Crusades, Volume Two:  The Kingdom of Jerusalem and the Frankish East, 1100-1187, Cambridge University Press, London, 1952, pgs. 116, 129

Christians of the First Crusade
History of Turkey